Kandachira is a village situated near Kollam  in Kollam District, Kerala state, India.

Politics
Manchallor is a part of Eravipuram assembly constituency in Kollam (Lok Sabha constituency). Shri. M. Noushad is the current MLA of Eravipuram. Shri.N.K. Premachandran is the current member of parliament of Kollam.

Geography
Kandachira is a village in Panayam panchayat in Kollam district. It is situated in Kandachiramudi of Ashtamudi Lake. Kandachira is in the south of Panayam panchayat. The bridge in this place connects places Kandachira, Kilikollur, Chathinamkulam etc. Kandachira bridge is a main landmark of Kandachira.

Transport
Perinad is the nearest railway station of Kandachra. The railway line to Kollam is passes through Kandachira.

References

Geography of Kollam district